Jackie Mooney (1938 – 30 December 2017) was an Irish soccer player during the 1960s and 1970s.

Mooney played for Shamrock Rovers, Athlone Town and Bohemians amongst others during his career in the League of Ireland.

Club career
Jackie was spotted playing for Home Farm by Billy Behan in 1955 and joined Manchester United. After 3 years at the club however, Mooney left Old Trafford without making the breakthrough. He had short spells at Bangor City and Cork Hibernians before signing for Shamrock Rovers where he made a scoring debut, against Shels in Dalymount Park on 22 August 1962. He scored for Rovers in the Inter-Cities Fairs Cup against Valencia C.F. in the Estadio Mestalla in 1963. He made a total of 6 appearances for the Hoops in European competition and was also the league top scorer in 1964/65 season with 16 goals

After sustaining a serious knee injury in a match against Shelbourne, Mooney was out of the game for 2 years. He returned to play for Aer Lingus in the Leinster Senior League for 2 years before Billy Young brought him back into football with Athlone Town when they re entered the league for the 1969-70 League of Ireland season. He had immediate success as Athlone won the Leinster Senior Cup for the first time with Mooney scoring a hat trick in the final. After a couple of seasons at Athlone, Jackie followed Young to Dalymount Park and Bohemians. He was top scorer for Bohs during the 1971/72 season. His goalscoring record for that season showed a total of 10 goals in 23 league games.

International career
He also represented the full Irish international team during the 1960s; marking his debut with a goal against Poland at Dalymount Park on 25 October 1964. In total he represented his country twice with his second cap coming against Belgium in March 1965.

Footballing family
His uncle Denis Doyle was a member of the very first Shamrock Rovers side to win the League of Ireland title in 1922/23. He went on to win three League medals and one FAI Cup medal during his time at Milltown. He also played on the occasion of Ireland's first international game which was against Italy in Turin in March 1926. His younger brother, Tommy "Netler" Doyle also played for Shamrock Rovers after Dinny had left the club. He went on to win the League of Ireland Shield and the Leinster Senior Cup while at Rovers.

Honours
League of Ireland
  Shamrock Rovers – 1963/64
FAI Cup: 2
  Shamrock Rovers – 1964, 1965
League of Ireland Shield: 4
  Shamrock Rovers – 1962/63, 1963/64, 1964/65, 1965/66
Leinster Senior Cup: 2
  Shamrock Rovers – 1964
  Athlone Town F.C. – 1969/70
Dublin City Cup
  Shamrock Rovers – 1963/64
Top Four Cup
  Shamrock Rovers – 1965/66
Blaxnit Cup
  Shamrock Rovers 1967/68

Sources
 The Hoops by Paul Doolan and Robert Goggins

References

1938 births
2017 deaths
Republic of Ireland international footballers
Republic of Ireland association footballers
League of Ireland players
Home Farm F.C. players
Manchester United F.C. players
Shamrock Rovers F.C. players
Bohemian F.C. players
Athlone Town A.F.C. players
Bangor City F.C. players
Cork Hibernians F.C. players
League of Ireland XI players
Leinster Senior League (association football) players
Association football inside forwards
Association footballers from Dublin (city)